Compustat is a database of financial, statistical, and market information on active and inactive global companies throughout the world. The service began in 1962.

This database provides products directed at institutional investors, universities, bankers, advisors, analysts, and asset/portfolio managers in corporate with, M&A, private capital, equity, and fixed income markets. The database covers 99,000 global securities, covering 99% of the world's total market capitalization with annual company data history available back to 1950 and quarterly data available back to 1962 (depending when that company was added to the database).

The following information is available:

Fundamentals

 Compustat Data including Compustat North America, Compustat International, Compustat Global, and Compustat Point-in-Time data sets
 Industry classification and universe management by GICS, NAICS and SIC
 Key market identifiers, including CUSIP, ISIN, and SEDOL

Integrated Databases

 Monthly and daily pricing data
 Standard & Poor's and other leading Index Data
 Estimates data from Capital IQ and Thomson I/B/E/S
 Qualitative content including business descriptions, officer information, and executive compensation
 Corporate Actions and Insider and Institutional Holdings

Proprietary Data

 Capital IQ qualitative data
 Standard & Poor’s Stock Reports
 Standard & Poor’s Industry Surveys
 Standard & Poor’s Issuer Credit Ratings

External links
  Official Website

Financial services companies of the United States
Statistical service organizations
Organizations established in 1962
American companies established in 1962
Financial services companies established in 1962